The 1942–43 season was the fourth Scottish football season in which Dumbarton competed in regional football during World War II.

Scottish Southern League

Each season in which Dumbarton had played in the Scottish Southern League saw an improvement in results and the third season was no different, by finishing 10th out of 16 with 28 points - 22 behind champions Rangers.  The positive league results included a first home league win over Celtic since 1892.

League Cup South

Dumbarton continued to find it difficult to find success in the League Cup South where again they failed to negotiate the sectional stage of the competition - gaining just a single draw from six matches.

Summer Cup

Dumbarton reached the second round of the Summer Cup before losing to eventual winners St Mirren.

Friendly

Player statistics

|}

Source:

Transfers

Players in

Players out 

In addition John McBride and David Corbett both played their last games in Dumbarton 'colours'.

Source:

Reserve team
For the first time since 1922, Dumbarton played a reserve team, and found a measure of success.

While they suffered a second round exit to Airdrie in the Scottish Second XI Cup, Dumbarton finishing as runners-up in the First Series of the Glasgow & District Reserve League and reached the final of the Glasgow & District Reserve League Cup before losing out to Motherwell.

References

Dumbarton F.C. seasons
Scottish football clubs 1942–43 season